Aubrac is a surname. Notable people with the surname include: 

Lucie Aubrac (1912–2007), French history teacher and WWII Resistance member
Raymond Aubrac (1914–2012), French Resistance leader